Tang-e Haft may refer to:

Istgah-e Tang-e Haft
Tang-e Haft Rural District